Ognjen Topić (Serbian: Oгњен Топић; born February 1, 1986) is a Bosnian-born Serbian American Muay Thai kickboxer. He holds several Muay Thai world titles and has fought some of the sport's top competitors.

Ognjen Topić is a three-time world champion in Muay Thai. Topic is also a former Lion Fight World Champion, having earned the title in 2013. He was named "Professional Rookie of the Year" at the Muay Thai Authority Awards in 2011.  He is also a World Boxing Council (WBC) North American Super Featherweight Champion and World Kickboxing Association (WKA) North American Lightweight Champion.

Background 
Topić was born into an ethnic Serb family in Bosnia and Herzegovina. His family fled the Bosnian War, first finding refuge in Serbia. Ognjen's father traveled to America to support the family financially. Later he won a U.S. green card through the immigration lottery. The family emigrated to the United States when Ognjen was nine years old.

When Topić hit the sixth grade, he and his father started to watch a lot of boxing on TV. This saw him yearn to be a pro boxer. But, with his parents coming over from Serbia, they did not want him to be a boxer. Topić wanted to fight any way he could, so he settled for Taekwondo.

In four years, Topić received his black belt in Taekwondo.

At 18, Topić first saw Muay Thai on ESPN. He saw the style of fight and fell in love. He found a Thai boxing gym not far from where he lived and started training in New Jersey.

Also a professional graphic designer, Topić graduated from William Paterson University with a bachelor's degree in Fine Art.

Muay Thai career

Overview
Topić is a resident of Pompton Lakes, New Jersey and has been training at a gym in New Jersey since 2005. A few years later, he trained at the Eminent Air Gym in Bangkok, Thailand, one of the top Muay Thai gyms in the country. Most recently, he has also trained at the P.K. Saenchai Muaythai Gym.

A professional Muay Thai athlete with over 50 professional fights, Topić has fought a number of competitors from Thailand. He has been in the ring with Saenchai (Ch 7 Champion), Paowarit Sasiprapa (Lumpinee Boxing Stadium Champion), Dechsakdaa Sitsongpeenong (Ch 7 Champion), Rungravee Sasiprapa (Lumpinee Stadium Champion), Dechsakda Sitsongpeenong (Ch 7 Champion) and Nontakit Tor. Mor. Sri.

2004 - 2005
Topić began his Muay Thai training when he was 18 years old at gym in New Jersey. He had his first fight after two years of training at age 20.

2007
Topić made his debut on "Friday Night Fights" in the basement of a church in New York City.

2013
Topić quit his full time job in graphic design in order to focus on his fighting career.

On March 15, 2013, Ognjen Topić made his Lion Fight debut at Lion Fight 9, facing former Lumpinee Stadium champion Paowarit Sasiprapa. He won the fight in upset fashion by head kick KO at 7 seconds of the third round.

2014 - 2017
Topić has become one of America's better known Super Featherweights. During this time, he has become a Muay Thai Grand Prix title holder, Lion Fight World Champion, WBC National Champion and WKA National/World Champion.

On September 26, 2015, he defeated Stephen Meleady at Lion Fight 24 to win the Lion Fight Lightweight World Championship.

On February 27, 2016, Topić lost the Lion Fight Lightweight World Title to Sergio Wielzen via TKO at Lion Fight 28.

In 2017, Topić fought Tum Sityodtong in the main event for Triumph Kombat 3 at Madison Square Garden.

On July 8, 2017, he defeated Paul Barber in the United Kingdom to become the Muay Thai Grand Prix Lightweight Champion.

2018
On March 2, 2018, Topić defeated Travis Clay by unanimous decision to win the Friday Night Fights Lightweight Championship.

Later on, he signed with ONE Championship to compete in the all-striking ONE Super Series. Topić made his promotional debut on May 12, 2018, at ONE Championship: Grit and Glory, defeating Stergos Mikkios by unanimous decision.

However, Ognjen Topić would go 0–3 in his next three fights in ONE Championship. He faced Tukkatatong Petpayathai at ONE Championship: Beyond The Horizon. However, Topic was outmatched by the former Lumpinee Stadium and Rajadamnern Stadium champion, losing by unanimous decision.

2019
Looking to bounce back, Ognjen Topić next faced Saemapetch Fairtex at ONE Championship: Roots of Honor on April 12, 2019. He was outpointed in the first two rounds but when Saemapetch slowed down in the third round, Topic was able to land some significant elbows. However, it proved too late as Topić still lost by majority decision.

Riding on the momentum of a decision victory over Petchtongkam Bangkok-Alaigym at Lumpinee Stadium, Ognjen Topić faced Alaverdi Ramazanov at ONE Championship: Dreams of Gold on August 16, 2019. However, being outsized, Topić found himself being floored 3 times en route to a first-round TKO loss.

Topić is currently focused on fighting internationally, teaching seminars and being a personal trainer. His home base is now in Bangkok, Thailand at the famed P.K Saenchai Muay Thai Gym.

Championships and awards 
 Siam Omnoi Stadium
 2022 Omnoi Stadium Lightweight Champion (one time, current) 
 Friday Night Fights
 Friday Night Fights Lightweight World Champion 
 Most "Fight of the Night" honors in Friday Night Fights history
 World Kickboxing Association
 WKA North American Lightweight Champion 
 2011 WKA Professional Fighter of the Month
 International Kickboxing Federation
 IKF World Lightweight Champion
 WBC Muaythai
 WBC Muaythai North American Super Featherweight Champion
 Muay Thai Grand Prix
 Muay Thai Grand Prix Lightweight World Champion
 Lion Fight 
 Lion Fight Lightweight World Champion
 Muay Thai Authority
 2011 North American Professional Rookie of the Year
 Muay Thai is Life
 2011 Break through Fighter of the Year
 New Jersey Martial Arts Hall of Fame
 2012 Fighter of the Year

Muay Thai record

|-  style="background:#fbb"
| 2023-02-15 || Loss ||align=left| Dentungthong Singhamawynn || Muay Thai Palangmai, Rajadamnern Stadium || Bangkok, Thailand || Decision || 5 ||3:00
|-  style="background:#fbb;"
| 2022-12-07 || Loss||align=left| Petchsirichai Detpetchseethong || Muay Thai Palangmai, Rajadamnern Stadium || Bangkok, Thailand || Decision || 5 || 3:00
|-  style="background:#fbb;"
| 2022-09-21 || Loss ||align=left| Jalill Barnes || Muay Thai Palangmai, Rajadamnern Stadium || Bangkok, Thailand || Decision || 5 ||3:00
|-  style="background:#fbb;"
| 2022-08-27 || Loss ||align=left| Paruhatnoi TBM Gym || SuekJaoMuayThai, Omnoi Stadium || Samut Sakhon, Thailand || Decision ||5  ||3:00
|-
! style=background:white colspan=9 |
|-  style="background:#CCFFCC;"
| 2022-07-02 ||Win ||align=left| Yodduangjai Sor.Jor.Montree || SuekJaoMuayThai, Omnoi Stadium || Samut Sakhon, Thailand || Decision ||5  ||3:00
|-
! style=background:white colspan=9 |
|-  style="background:#c5d2ea;"
| 2021-12-25 || Draw ||align=left| Yodduangjai Sor.Jor.Montree || SuekJaoMuayThai, Omnoi Stadium || Samut Sakhon, Thailand || Decision ||5  ||3:00
|-
! style=background:white colspan=9 |
|-  style="background:#CCFFCC;"
| 2021-12-25 || Win||align=left| Chalawan JomhodMuayThai || SuekJaoMuayThai, Omnoi Stadium || Samut Sakhon, Thailand || Decision ||5  ||3:00
|-  style="background:#FFBBBB;"
| 2021-10-30 || Loss||align=left| Songfangkong FA Group || SuekJaoMuayThai, Omnoi Stadium || Samut Sakhon, Thailand || Decision ||5  ||3:00
|-  style="background:#CCFFCC;"
| 2021-04-03 || Win||align=left| Fahlikit Sor Parath || TorNamThai Lumpinee TKO Kiatpetch, Lumpinee Stadium || Bangkok, Thailand || TKO ||4  ||
|-  style="background:#CCFFCC;"
| 2020-02-11 || Win||align=left| Yodkhunpon Mor.RajabhatMubanChomBueng || P.K.Saenchai + Sor.Jor.Tongprachin, Lumpinee Stadium || Bangkok, Thailand || Decision||5  ||3:00
|-  style="background:#CCFFCC;"
| 2019-12-10 || Win||align=left| Sang-anda Rachanon || Lumpinee Stadium || Bangkok, Thailand || TKO  ||5  ||
|-  style="background:#FFBBBB;"
| 2019-08-16 || Loss ||align=left| Alaverdi Ramazanov || ONE Championship: Dreams of Gold || Bangkok, Thailand ||TKO (Punch) ||1  ||
|-  style="background:#CCFFCC;"
| 2019-05-10 || Win||align=left| Petchtongkam Bangkok-Alaigym || Lumpinee Stadium || Bangkok, Thailand || Decision  ||5  ||3:00
|-  style="background:#FFBBBB;"
| 2019-04-12 || Loss ||align=left| Saemapetch Fairtex || ONE Championship: Roots of Honor || Pasay, Philippines || Decision (Majority) ||3  ||3:00
|-  style="background:#CCFFCC;"
| 2018-12-11 || Win||align=left| David Singpatong || Lumpinee Stadium || Bangkok, Thailand || Decision  ||5  ||3:00
|-  style="background:#FFBBBB;"
| 2018-09-08 || Loss ||align=left| Tukkatatong Petpayathai || ONE Championship: Beyond The Horizon || Shanghai, China || Decision ||3  ||3:00
|-  style="background:#CCFFCC;"
| 2018-05-12 || Win ||align=left| Stergos Mikkios || ONE Championship: Grit and Glory || Jakarta, Indonesia || Decision (Unanimous) ||3  ||3:00
|-  style="background:#CCFFCC;"
| 2018-03-02|| Win ||align=left| Travis Clay || Friday Night Fights || United States || Decision (Unanimous) || 5 || 3:00
|-
! style=background:white colspan=9 |
|-  style="background:#CCFFCC;"
| 2017-07-08 || Win ||align=left| Paul Barber || Capital 1 || Dublin, Ireland ||Decision  ||5  ||3:00 
|-
! style=background:white colspan=9 |
|-  style="background:#FFBBBB;"
| 2017-06-09 || Loss ||align=left| Tum Sityodtong || Triumph Kombat 3 || New York, United States ||Decision  ||5  ||3:00 
|-
! style=background:white colspan=9 |
|-  style="background:#FFBBBB;"
| 2016-10-28|| Loss||align=left| Saenchai || Yokkao 22 || Hong Kong || Decision || 3 || 3:00
|-  style="background:#CCFFCC;"
| 2016-05-27|| Win||align=left| Dechsakda Sitsongpeenong || Lion Fight 29 || Connecticut, United States || Decision || 5 || 3:00
|-  bgcolor="#FFBBBB"
| 2016-02-27 || Loss||align=left| Sergio Wielzen || Lion Fight 28 || Connecticut, United States || TKO (doctor stoppage)|| 3 || 0:50
|-
! style=background:white colspan=9 |
|-  style="background:#FFBBBB;"
| 2016-01-17|| Loss||align=left| Banpetch K-Sulian Pattaya ||Max Muay Thai|| Thailand || Decision || 3 || 3:00
|-  style="background:#FFBBBB;"
| 2015-12-13|| Loss ||align=left| Kanthep MTM Academy || Max Muay Thai|| Thailand || Decision || 3 || 3:00
|-
! style=background:white colspan=9 |
|-  bgcolor="#CCFFCC"
| 2015-09-26 || Win||align=left| Stephen Meleady || Lion Fight 24 ||  United States || Decision || 5 || 3:00
|-
! style=background:white colspan=9 |
|-  style="background:#CCFFCC;"
| 2014-11-21|| Win ||align=left| Rungravee Sasiprapa || Lion Fight 19 || Connecticut, United States || Decision || 5 || 3:00
|-  style="background:#CCFFCC;"
| 2013-07-26 || Win ||align=left| Coke Chunhawat || Lion Fight 10 || Las Vegas, United States || Decision (Split)  ||5  ||3:00
|-  style="background:#CCFFCC;"
| 2013-03-15 || Win ||align=left| Paowarit Sasiprapa || Lion Fight 9 || Las Vegas, United States || KO (High Kick) ||3  ||0:07
|-  style="background:#FFBBBB;"
| 2012-08-18 || Loss ||align=left| Neungsiam Samphusri || Push Kick ||  United States || Decision (Split) ||5  || 3:00
|-  style="background:#CCFFCC;"
| 2012-06-02 || Win||align=left| Rami Ibrahim || Warriors Cup ||  United States || KO ||3  ||
|-  style="background:#CCFFCC;"
| 2011-07-23 || Win||align=left| Tony Manoharan || ||  United States || Decision  ||3  || 3:00
|-  style="background:#FFBBBB;"
| 2011-05-14 || Loss ||align=left| Anthony Castrejon || Battle in the Desert 2 ||  United States || Decision  ||5  || 3:00
|-  style="background:#CCFFCC;"
| 2008-10-24 || Win ||align=left| Abe Estacio || Friday Night Fights ||  New York City, United States || Decision (Unanimous)  ||5  || 3:00
|-  style="background:#FFBBBB;"
| 2008-09-26 || Loss ||align=left| Kittisak Noiwibon || Friday Night Fights ||  New York City, United States || Decision  ||5  || 3:00
|-  style="background:#c5d2ea;"
| 2008-05-02 || Draw||align=left| Omar Ahmed || Friday Night Fights  ||  United States || Decision  ||3  || 3:00 
|-
| colspan=9 | Legend:

References

1986 births
Living people
Lightweight kickboxers
American male kickboxers
American Muay Thai practitioners
Serbian emigrants to the United States
People from Pompton Lakes, New Jersey
William Paterson University alumni
ONE Championship kickboxers